Sergei Aleksandrovich Medvedev (born December 20, 1966) is a Russian scholar. He is currently a professor at the Charles University in Prague, and he has previously worked at the Marshall Center for Security Studies in Germany, the Finnish Institute of International Affairs in Helsinki, the Istituto Affari Internazionali in Rome, and the Institute of Europe in Moscow. 

Medvedev won the 2020 Pushkin House Russian Book Prize for his book The Return of the Russian Leviathan. The book was translated by Stephen Dalziel, and was widely praised in the US and UK.

References

1966 births
21st-century Russian journalists
Living people
Academic staff of the Higher School of Economics
People listed in Russia as media foreign agents

Redkollegia award winners
Russian activists against the 2022 Russian invasion of Ukraine
Russian male journalists
Russian male writers